Vehmersalmi is a former municipality of Finland. It has been a part of the city of Kuopio since January 1, 2005.

It is located in the province of Eastern Finland and is part of the Northern Savonia region. The municipality had a population of 2,053 (2003) and covered an area of 550.59 km² of which 202.47 km² is water. The population density was 5.9 inhabitants per km².

The municipality was unilingually Finnish. Vehmersalmi ceased to exist as of 1 January 2005 when it was merged into Kuopio.

Villages

Enonlahti, Horsmanlahti, Juonionlahti, Jänissalo, Litmaniemi, Miettilä, Niinimäki, Putroniemi, Puutosmäki, Ritoniemi, Roikansaari, Räsälä, Vuorisalo, Mustinlahti and Kohma.

Culture

Food
In the 1980s, stockfish soup was considered the traditional food of the former parish of Vehmersalmi.

References

Kuopio
Populated places disestablished in 2005
Former municipalities of Finland
2005 disestablishments in Finland